The Big Read initiative was launched in Germany by the public television broadcaster ZDF in 2004, under the name "Das große Lesen". Based on the BBC version of Big Read, it was designed as a game show to determine the top 50 books read and liked by the German people.

An initial list of 200 books was sent to more than 10,000 bookshops to start the survey. Supported by the Börsenverein des Deutschen Buchhandels and Stiftung Lesen 60,000 votes were already cast within the first week.
Four weeks later the list had grown to 
12,615 book nominations, and after the casting of 250,000 votes the 'winners' were determined.

Results

 The Lord of the Rings by J. R. R. Tolkien
 The Bible
 The Pillars of the Earth by Ken Follett
 Perfume by Patrick Süskind
 The Little Prince by Antoine de Saint-Exupéry
 Buddenbrooks by Thomas Mann
 The Physician by Noah Gordon
 The Alchemist by Paulo Coelho
 Harry Potter and the Philosopher's Stone by J. K. Rowling
 Pope Joan by Donna Cross
 Inkheart by Cornelia Funke
 Outlander a.k.a. Cross Stitch by Diana Gabaldon
 The House of the Spirits by Isabel Allende

 The Reader by Bernhard Schlink
 Faust by Johann Wolfgang von Goethe
 The Shadow of the Wind by Carlos Ruiz Zafón
 Pride and Prejudice by Jane Austen
 The Name of the Rose by Umberto Eco
 Angels & Demons by Dan Brown
 Effi Briest by Theodor Fontane
 Harry Potter and the Order of the Phoenix by J. K. Rowling
 The Magic Mountain by Thomas Mann
 Gone with the Wind by Margaret Mitchell
 Siddhartha by Hermann Hesse
 The Discovery of Heaven by Harry Mulisch
 The Neverending Story by Michael Ende

References

External links
BBC Big Read website

German literature
Lists of novels